Chaetogastra versicolor is a species of flowering plant in the family Melastomataceae, native to Brazil. It was first described by John Lindley in 1827 as Rhexia versicolor. One of its synonyms is Tibouchina versicolor.

Chaetogastra versicolor has flowers with four petals and eight stamens, rather than five and ten as in many other species of Chaetogastra. The petals are white, turning pink as they age. The leaves are reddish underneath.

References

versicolor
Flora of Brazil
Plants described in 1827